Muang Kham is a village and tambon (subdistrict) of Phan District, in Chiang Rai Province, Thailand. In 2005 it had a total population of 8837 people. The tambon contains 17 villages.

References

Tambon of Chiang Rai province
Populated places in Chiang Rai province